Davazdah Cheshmeh, also called the Davazdah Pelleh (old name Haraz Bridge), is a bridge in Amol, Iran. The bridge is a monument Mazandaran. The Bridge is located in the  center of the city, near Moalagh Bridge and connects the east of the city to the western sector and the longest bridge on Haraz River with the total length of 127.40 metres (418.0 ft). The same was constructed in the 18th century. Mohammad Hassan Khan Etemad al-Saltanah says About history Davazdah Cheshmeh, that though the bridge was there before the Safavid era, it was completed during time of Abbas I of Persia. The Achaemenids built on a grand scale. The artists and materials they used were brought from all territories. was laid out with an extensive park with bridges, gardens, colonnaded palaces and open column pavilions.

Notes
 General Specifications of Mazandaran Province - Ministry of Industry
 Persia and the Persian Question - Page 381

References

Architecture in Iran
Bridges in Iran
Tourist attractions in Amol
Tourist attractions in Mazandaran Province